Teodoras Četrauskas (born 1944) is a Lithuanian writer and literary translator. He has translated more than one hundred and forty books from German into Lithuanian, including the writing of Günter Grass, Thomas Bernhard, Franz Kafka, Elias Canetti, Siegfried Lenz, Alfred Döblin and Michael Ende.

Teodoras Četrauskas was born in Čiobiškis, Širvintos district municipality. He studied German language and literature at Vilnius University.

Style
Teodoras Četrauskas' work has the unique quality of satirically taking on important topics and issues present in society. He does not shy away from discussing what other writers do not have the courage to scrutinize.

References

External links
 Books from Lithuania: Teodoras Četrauskas
 

1944 births
Living people
Lithuanian translators
Translators to Lithuanian
Translators from German